Oreopanax klugii is a species of plant in the family Araliaceae. It is endemic to Peru.

References

Flora of Peru
klugii
Data deficient plants
Taxonomy articles created by Polbot